Dolichopteryx vityazi,  is a species of fish found in the Pacific Ocean.

Size

Etymology
The fish is named in honor of the ship R/V Vityaz (also spelled Vitiaz), from which the first author caught the type specimen on the ship's 26th cruise.

References 

Opisthoproctidae
Fish of the Pacific Ocean
Taxa named by Nikolai Vasilyevich Parin
Taxa named by Tatyana Nikolaevna Belyanina
Taxa named by Sergei Afanasievich Evseenko
Fish described in 2009